is a town located in Niwa District, Aichi Prefecture, Japan. , the town had an estimated population of 24,160 in 9547 households, and a population density of 1,775 persons per km².

Geography
Ōguchi is located in the extreme northeast corner of Aichi Prefecture, in the middle of the Nōbi Plain. The Gojō River flows through the town.

Neighboring municipalities
Aichi Prefecture
Inuyama
Kōnan
Komaki
Fusō

Demographics
Per Japanese census data, the population of Ōguchi has increased steadily over the past 50 years.

Climate
The town has a climate characterized by hot and humid summers, and relatively mild winters (Köppen climate classification Cfa).  The average annual temperature in Ōguchi is 15.6 °C. The average annual rainfall is 1819 mm with September as the wettest month. The temperatures are highest on average in August, at around 28.0 °C, and lowest in January, at around 4.1 °C.

History
The villages of Kashiwamori, Ōta, Ōguchi and Tominari were created within Niwa District, Aichi with the establishment of the modern municipalities system in 1889. On October 1, 1906 Ōta, Ōguchi and Tominari and a portion of Kashiwamori merged to form the village of Ōguchi. It was raised to town status in 1962.

Economy
Okuma Corporation and Yamazaki Mazak Corporation, two global machine tool builder companies have their headquarters in the city, as well as global automotive components supplier Tokai Rika.

Education
Ōguchi has three public elementary schools and one public junior high school operated by the town government, and one public high school operated by the Aichi Prefectural Board of Education..

Transportation

Railway
Ōguchi is not served by passenger rail transport.

Highway

Sister city relations
 - Matsue, Shimane, Japan, sister city since August 29, 2015

Local attractions

Ōguchi Castle

References

External links

  

 
Towns in Aichi Prefecture